Fontanarosa is a surname. Notable people with the surname include:

 Dario Fontanarosa, former chairman of Adelaide United FC
 Lucien Fontanarosa (1912–1975), French painter
 Patrice Fontanarosa (born 1942), French classical violinist and actor

Other uses 
 Fontanarosa, town and comune in the province of Avellino, Campania, southern Italy